Berta is an Israeli fashion house known for its expertise in luxury bridal fashion and evening wear. Founded by the sole designer of the brand, Berta Balilti.

History
Berta Balilti (born December 11, 1964), studied fashion at the Shenkar College of Engineering and Design in Tel Aviv.

Flagships
Berta's studio is in Ashdod, Israel.

Awards and notables

Berta's collection presentations have included:

 The F/W16 bridal collection presented at The Plaza Hotel during the October 2015 bridal fashion week in New York.
 The Berta S/S17 collection presented at Harvard Club of New York in April 2016.
 The F/W20 runway at the World Trade center in October 2019

Recognition
Berta was recognized by The New York Times as one of the main bridal designers who caused a big shift in the bridal fashion world to a more sexy and bold style of dresses, and was covered by some of the top influencing bridal magazines and blogs such as Theknot, BRIDES, Style me pretty, Vogue, and Wedding chicks.

In popular culture
Britney Spears, Priyanka Chopra, Sharon Stone and Carrie Underwood have worn Berta evening to various events. Kylie Jenner and Kourtney Kardashian were also featured in Berta as part of the launch of the Stormi collection and a cover photoshoot to Vogue Arabia. Ariana Grande wore a mini Berta on her music video of "Don't call me angel". Sofia Vergara wore a Berta gown for the AGT 2021 finals.

References

External links
Official Website
eDresstore Website
Berta Bridal en Madrid España

Wedding dress designers
Israeli fashion designers